The International Numismata Orientalia  was an important series of publications relating to numismatics of the Middle East and South Asia, with articles contributed by specialist numismatists, published by Messrs Trübner & Co., London, in the late nineteenth century.

The inspiration for this series  
The inspiration for the series was the Numismata Orientalia produced by William Marsden, and published earlier in the nineteenth century, which opened up numismatic research in the Middle East and throughout Asia.

The title 
The entire series was intended to be a new edition of Marsden's Numismata Orientalia, but it reached beyond the scope of Marsden's work, and from Part 2 onwards was known as International Numismata Orientalia.

The plan for the series 
Details of the plan for the entire series were outlined by Edward Thomas in his preface to Vol. 1, part 1:

Publications 
 Part 1: Ancient Indian Weights, by Edward Thomas, 1874
 Part 2: Coins of the Urtuki Turkumans, by Stanley Lane Poole, 1875
 Part 3: The Coinage of Lydia and Persia, by Barclay V. Head, 1877
 Part 4: The Coins of the Tuluni Dynasty, by E T Rogers, 1877
 Part 5: The Parthian Coinage, by Percy Gardner, 1877
 Part 6: On the Ancient Coins and Measures of Ceylon, by T W Rhys Davids, 1877
 Part 7: Coins of the Jews, by Frederic W. Madden, 1881
 Part 8: Coins of Arakan, of Pegu, and of Burma, by Arthur Phayre, 1882
 Part 9: Coins of Southern India, by Sir Walter Elliot, 1886

References 

Numismatics